The 1900–01 City Cup was the seventh edition of the City Cup, a cup competition in Irish football.

The tournament was won by Linfield for the fifth time and second consecutive year.

Group standings

References

1900–01 in Irish association football